JIAAC can refer to:
 Junta de Investigación de Accidentes de Aviación Civil (Argentina)
 Junta Investigadora de Accidentes de Aviación Civil (Venezuela)